Thomas Caldwell may refer to:

 Thomas Caldwell (soldier) (1894–1969), Scottish recipient of the Victoria Cross
 Thomas Boyd Caldwell (1856–1932), Canadian politician
 Thomas Caldwell (sport shooter), competed in the 1908 Summer Olympics
 Tommy Caldwell (born 1978), American rock climber
 Tommy Caldwell (footballer) (1885–1967), English footballer
 Tommy Caldwell (musician) (1949–1980), bassist/vocalist for the Marshall Tucker Band
 Tom Caldwell (1921–2002), Irish politician, interior designer, and art dealer
 Thomas Wakem Caldwell (1867–1937), farmer and political figure in New Brunswick, Canada